In algebraic geometry, a homogeneous variety is an algebraic variety of the form G/P, G a linear algebraic group, P a parabolic subgroup. It is a smooth projective variety. If P is a Borel subgroup, it is usually called a flag variety.

See also 
Homogeneous space
Symmetric space
Symmetric variety

Algebraic varieties